Air Commodore Nazir Latif SJ and Bar (10 July 1927 – 30 June 2011) was an officer in the Pakistan Air Force and a former director-general of the Operations and Plans at the Air Headquarters, Islamabad. Latif was one of the distinguished Christian pilots who participated and fought, for Pakistan side, in 1965 Indo-Pak War and the 1971 Bangladesh Liberation War.

Early life
Nazir Latif was born into a highly educated Christian family in 1927. Bill Latif grew up in Lahore, where his father was a well-known professor of psychology and had done his doctorate at Princeton University. His father taught at FC College in Lahore as a full professor.

Air Force Career
Bill Latif had always wanted to be a fighter pilot and joined the Pakistan Air Force soon after the Creation of Pakistan in 1947. He was accepted in Pakistan Air Force Academy in 1947. He did 8th GD pilot's course but because of his high standard in flying, was upgraded to the 7th GD (P) course and graduated in 1950. Nazir was sent to Great Britain where he attended and graduated from Royal Air Force College Cranwell in 1954.

In 1958, he was promoted to Wing Commander when Air Marshal Asghar Khan assumed as Chief of Air Staff of the Pakistan Air Force.

In 1971 he was base commander of the Mauripur Base. Latif was awarded the Sitara-e-Jurat twice for his services in 1965 and 1971 wars between Pakistan and India.

Latif worked in Khorramshahr, Iran, Amman, Jordan and Bahrain between the years from 1976 until he retired in his mid 70's.

In 2007 he was shot and injured by some unidentified persons while out walking.

Latif died on June 30, 2011 in the Pakistan Air Force Hospital in Islamabad.

External links
 Defence Journal
 History of PIA
 Defence Journal
 PAF Falcons

References

Pakistan Air Force officers
Graduates of the Royal Air Force College Cranwell
Recipients of Sitara-e-Jurat
Pakistani Christians
1927 births
2011 deaths
Pakistani flying aces